The Denots Crew (TDC) is a group of international Street artists, musicians and dancer.
Their artwork and music productions pushed Berlin Hip-Hop- and Graffiti History since 1982 to europes main cities of today.

HISTORY 
 Graffiti - group "The Unknown 3" (Deza aka Combo, Crime, Crazy Colour, from 1985 Rebel and since 1987 Kaos)
 German Rap-group: "The Denots Crew"
 German Breakdance Group "Ku-Damm"
 German Punk Rock Band "Razzia"

Those 4 groups started separately but became one as the Denots Crew because of their affinity to Skateboarding and their hometown Märkisches Viertel
a huge skyscraper district up on north of Berlin.

Beginning "The Early Days 1980s" 
At the beginning of the 1980s, West Berlin was still surrounded by the Berlin Wall. American hiphop had hardly been seen on the streets of Europe. But it changed suddenly. Nearly at the same time.
And all over Europe's main cities like Berlin, Paris, London and Amsterdam. In Berlin The Denots Crew started with breakdance shows in a popular tourist place called Kudamm.
And they painted the first street art on the Berlin Wall in 1983 which became the original East Side Gallery later on.
In 1986 Denots Crew met up with Keith Haring while he had painted a 100 m section of the Berlin Wall.
Denots Crew continued experimentally and started the integration of American HipHop culture into Berlin's youth. Just like other pioneers of Europe's hiphop culture like Mode2 in London, Niels Shoe Meulman in Amsterdam and Ash (artist) from the Bad Boys Crew in Paris.

Denots Crew Today 
Since the early 1990s most of the Denots Crew members are involved in various social or commercial projects worldwide.
Many of the original denots Crew artworks are still extant, inside and outside Berlin. For example:
A segment of the Berlin Wall on display at the Ronald Reagan Presidential Library in Simi Valley, California, 2004 Art by Kaos.
A Berlin Wall art relic in Bedok Reservoir Park in Singapore. 2010 Artist: Kaos.
Today the Denots Crew is named and known as the pioneers of the Berlin hiphop scene.

Sources 
 Berlin, le mur vit; Christian Bourguignon (ua.) ; Editions de l´est;1990, 
 "Hallo Nachbar" Press 1997, Denots Crew commercial Mural Project
 Interview: Rebel MC. 25 years German Hip Hop Scene, Schwarzkopf & Schwarzkopf, 2000
 "Style 1983 Graffiti by Crime TDC". 2009 Goethe-Institut Stockholm "Graffiti and other Art on the Berlin Wall" by Johannes Stahl

press and printed articles 
 TV Show german channel NDR in 1986 All about the graffiti group "Unknown 3": Crazy Colour, DEZA, Crime
 Berliner press Article 19.05. 1999 Graffiti - Art or vandalism 
 "Rock News 1989"
 Interview with Crime „Die Mauer“, DTV Verlag 2011. Covergraffiti by Crime
 Interview of Crime , Berliner Zeitung 2002
 Berliner Stadtmagazin TIP Article Berlin HipHop Scene in 1987
 25years german Hip Hop Scene "Bei uns geht einiges" Schwarzkopf & Schwarzkopf Verlag
 Märkisches Viertel Newspaper MV Express 1986 "Graffiti wurde übermalt"

Concerts 
 Berlin Old School Revival Concert 2008  
 Konzertplakat mit Rebel und Lady Zue, 1989 
 "Rock News 1989"
 "The Denots Crew / Quartier Latin 1988"

Music Productions and Releases 
 Gotta Rock Tape 1986 
 Rebel One

Biographies and portfolio of Denots Crew Members today 

 Deza  (Graphic Design)
 Panter a.k.a. Crime   (Graphic Design / Street Art Artist) 
 Kaos   (DJ and Art) 
 Streetstyler.org  (International Street Art ) 
 Rebel One  (MC + Rapper) 
 Phet One  (Street Art Artist) 

Hip Hop
Murals
Berlin Wall
German graffiti artists